Ramsden Square is a square located at the intersection of Abbey Road and Duke Street in Barrow-in-Furness, Cumbria, England. It marks the boundary of the Central and Hindpool wards and now acts as a major roundabout. Ramsden Square was first laid out in the 1840s to act as a focal point of Sir James Ramsden's master plan for the new town of Barrow, separating its burgeoning industries and commercial core. The centerpiece of the square is a statue of Ramsden himself while it is framed by a number of historic buildings including Barrow Central Library, the National Westminster Bank Building and formerly the Barrow Jute Works.

See also
 Schneider Square
 St. George's Square

References

Ramsden Square
Ramsden Square
Ramsden Square